Blacks Fork (also referred to as Blacks Fork of the Green River) is a  tributary of the Green River in  Utah and Wyoming in the United States.

Description
The river rises on the northern side of the Uinta Mountains in the Uinta-Wasatch-Cache National Forest in Summit County, Utah, as the combination of three streams draining the area around Tokewanna Peak near the Utah–Wyoming border. Just before the river crosses into Wyoming, it flows into Meeks Cabin Reservoir, which is used for irrigation and flood control. After entering Uinta County in Wyoming and then flowing out of the reservoir, the river leaves the national forest. It then flows northeast through unincorporated community of Millburne and along the edge of the census-designated place of Fort Bridger. Turning to a nearly eastern course, the river passes under Interstate 80 (I‑80) before joining with the Smiths Fork (possibly named for Jedediah Smith), which forms just east of the Blacks Fork in the Uinta Mountains and parallels it for most of its course. The river continues northeast, very briefly passing through the extreme southeast corner of Lincoln, Wyoming, (where it turns east) before entering Sweetwater County, Wyoming. The river then meets the Hams Fork from the north on the southwest edge of Granger. Promptly after entering Granger, the river passes along the south edge of the Granger Stage Station and then passes under U.S. Route 30 (US 30). Shortly after that, the river makes sharp turn south (passing under I‑80/US 30) and eventually entering the Flaming Gorge National Recreation Area and joining the Green River at Flaming Gorge Reservoir

History
The river is named for Arthur Black, who trapped in the area in 1824 as an employee of the Ashley/Henry Company. In 1843, mountain man Jim Bridger and his partner Louis Vasquez constructed a trading post on the Blacks Fork, located west of the present-day Lyman, known later as Fort Bridger. The post soon became a popular stop along the Oregon and California trails and later marked the point at which the Mormon Trail left the other two and continued into Utah.

See also

 List of rivers of Utah
 List of Wyoming rivers
 List of tributaries of the Colorado River

References

External links

Tributaries of the Green River (Colorado River tributary)
Rivers of Utah
Rivers of Wyoming
Features of the Uinta Mountains
Rivers of Daggett County, Utah
Rivers of Summit County, Utah
Rivers of Lincoln County, Wyoming
Rivers of Sweetwater County, Wyoming
Rivers of Uinta County, Wyoming
Wasatch-Cache National Forest
California Trail
Mormon Trail
Oregon Trail
Tributaries of the Colorado River in Utah
Tributaries of the Colorado River in Wyoming